John W. Chandler was a state legislator in Mississippi. From 1872 to 1876 he represented Noxubee County in the Mississippi House of Representatives.

He was a district delegate at the 1872 Republican National Convention. He served on the Judiciary Committee. He was a census official in 1889.

References

Year of birth missing (living people)
Living people
19th-century American politicians
Republican Party members of the Mississippi House of Representatives
People from Noxubee County, Mississippi